Paul Ray Jetton (October 6, 1964 – May 13, 2016) was an American football offensive lineman who played four seasons in the National Football League with the Cincinnati Bengals and New Orleans Saints. He was drafted by the Cincinnati Bengals in the sixth round of the 1988 NFL Draft. He played college football at the University of Texas at Austin and attended Jersey Village High School in Jersey Village, Texas. He died in 2016 in Wimberley, Texas where he made his home.

References

External links
Just Sports Stats

1964 births
2016 deaths
Players of American football from Houston
American football offensive linemen
Jersey Village High School alumni
Texas Longhorns football players
Cincinnati Bengals players
New Orleans Saints players
People from Wimberley, Texas